KOZE or Koze may refer to:

 KOZE (AM), a radio station (950 AM) licensed to Lewiston, Idaho, United States
 KOZE-FM, a radio station (96.5 FM) licensed to Lewiston
 KLER (AM), a radio station (1300 AM) licensed to Lewiston, Idaho, which held the call sign KOZE from 1964 until the 1990s.
 DJ Koze, a German electronic music producer